Thomas Schamberg (born December 1946) is a New Hampshire politician.

Education
Schamberg earned a J.D. from Massachusetts School of Law in 2006.

Career
Schamberg is a retired teacher. Schamberg served as mayor of Orwell, Ohio for 14 and a half years. He was elected to the Wilmot (N.H.) Board of Selectmen in March 2015 and is now serving his second term. On November 6, 2018, Schamberg was elected to the New Hampshire House of Representatives where he represents the Merrimack 4 district. Schamberg assumed office on December 5, 2018. Schamberg is a Democrat.

Personal life
Schamberg resides in Wilmot, New Hampshire. On May 19, 2005, Schamberg's son, Kurt, died at the age of 26 in a roadside bombing while serving the Iraq War.

References

Living people
Mayors of places in Ohio
People from Wilmot, New Hampshire
People from Orwell, Ohio
Massachusetts School of Law alumni
Democratic Party members of the New Hampshire House of Representatives
21st-century American politicians
1946 births